A Christmas Celebration may refer to:

 A Christmas Celebration (Celtic Woman album)
 A Christmas Celebration (Gladys Knight album)

See also
 Christmas Celebration, an album by Mannheim Steamroller